Laurence Thornton "Laurie" Bliss (November 28, 1872 – November 12, 1942) was an American football player and coach.  He served as the head football coach at the United States Military Academy in 1893 and at Lehigh University in 1895, compiling a career college football record of 7–11.  Bliss played football at Yale University as a halfback alongside his brother, C. D. "Pop" Bliss, who went on to coach at Stanford University, Haverford College, and the University of Missouri. After graduation, he played with the amateur Chicago Athletic Association.

Coaching career

Army
Bliss took his first head coaching job at the United States Military Academy in 1893 and led the team to a 4–5 record. He was the third person appointed to the position of head football coach at West Point.

Lehigh
Bliss was the fourth head football coach at Lehigh University in Bethlehem, Pennsylvania and he held that position for the 1895 season.  His  coaching record at Lehigh was 3–6.

Head coaching record

References

External links
 

1872 births
1942 deaths
19th-century players of American football
American football halfbacks
Army Black Knights football coaches
Chicago Athletic Association players
Lehigh Mountain Hawks football coaches
Yale Bulldogs football players
Players of American football from New York City